The World No-Gi Brazilian Jiu-Jitsu Championship is a no-gi Brazilian Jiu-Jitsu (BJJ) tournament hosted annually by the International Brazilian Jiu-Jitsu Federation held at California State University in Long Beach, California. The 2022 edition was held in Anaheim, California from December 7 to December 11, 2022.

History 
Since its creation in 2007, Caio Terra has won 10 No-Gi World Championships, the highest in IBJJF No-Gi competition history. Bia Mesquita has won 5 No-Gi World Championships, the highest number of women's championships.

Weight classes

Competitions by year

Men's black belt world champions 

The results listed for 2022 are tentative. On 8 March 2023, the IBJJF announced that three 2022 adult black-belt gold medalists were disqualified due to use of performance-enhancing drugs. However, as of 10 March 2023, the IBJJF's official results still listed them as winners. This table assumes that the silver medalists were promoted to champion, although the IBJJF has not clearly stated that.

Women's black belt world champions 
Prior to 2012, women's adult brown and black belts competed together at the "Adult / Brown Black" belt level.

List of winners by total titles

See also 
 International Brazilian Jiu-Jitsu Federation
 World IBJJF Jiu-Jitsu Championship
 Pan Jiu-Jitsu Championship
 Pan Jiu-Jitsu No-Gi Championship
 European Open Championship
 European Open Nogi Championship
 Brazilian National Jiu-Jitsu Championship
 Brazilian Nationals Jiu-Jitsu No-Gi Championship
 Asian Open Championship
 Abu Dhabi Combat Club Submission Wrestling World Championship

References

External links 
 

Brazilian jiu-jitsu competitions
Jiu-Jitsu, No-gi
World No-Gi Brazilian Jiu-Jitsu Championship
No-Gi Brazilian jiu-jitsu competitions